John Edward Kenna (April 10, 1848January 11, 1893) was an American politician who was a Senator from West Virginia from 1883 until his death.

Biography
Kenna was born in Kanawha County, Virginia (now West Virginia, near the city of St. Albans) and lived his early life at Upper Falls, where his father was lockmaster and owned a sawmill. He had little education, and at the age of 16 he served in the "Iron Brigade" with General Joseph O. Shelby in the Confederate States Army and was wounded. After returning home, he read law and was admitted to the bar in 1870. He became very active in the emerging Democratic Party of West Virginia.

He rose from prosecuting attorney of Kanawha County in 1872 to Justice pro tempore of the county circuit in 1875, and to the United States House of Representatives in 1876. While in the House he championed railroad legislation and crusaded for aid for slack-water navigation to help the coal, timber, and salt industries in his state. These activities earned him a seat in the United States Senate in 1883, where he continued fighting for his two causes.

Kenna became Democratic minority leader and emerged as a powerful and controversial speaker on the issue of the independence of the executive branch of the government. He forcefully defended President Grover Cleveland on several issues and indicted the Senate Republican majority for failure to pass tariff reforms. Kenna was a practicing Catholic and member of the congregation at St. Joseph's on Capitol Hill in Washington, D.C. His career was cut short with his sudden death at the age of 44 on January 11, 1893.

Longtime Washington journalist Benjamin Perley Poore described Kenna as "a tall, thick-set man" who was "negligent in his dress and rather slow in the utterance of his sentences."

Kenna is the namesake of the town of Kenna, West Virginia. In 1901, the state of West Virginia donated a marble statue of Kenna to the U.S. Capitol's National Statuary Hall Collection.

See also
List of United States Congress members who died in office (1790–1899)

References

External links

 Architect of the Capitol/Capitol Complex/Art/John E. Kenna
US Congress Biographical Directory
Finding Aid for John Edward Kenna Collection, WV State Archives and History

1848 births
1893 deaths
19th-century American judges
19th-century American lawyers
19th-century American politicians
19th-century Roman Catholics
American lawyers admitted to the practice of law by reading law
Catholics from West Virginia
Confederate States Army personnel
County prosecuting attorneys in West Virginia
Democratic Party members of the United States House of Representatives from West Virginia
Democratic Party United States senators from West Virginia
Lawyers from Charleston, West Virginia
Military personnel from West Virginia
People from St. Albans, West Virginia
People of West Virginia in the American Civil War
Politicians from Charleston, West Virginia
West Virginia circuit court judges
West Virginia lawyers